Selvaggio Primitelli (died 1615) was a Roman Catholic prelate who served as Bishop of Lavello (1613–1615).

Biography
On 11 February 1613, Selvaggio Primitelli was appointed during the papacy of Pope Paul V as Bishop of Lavello.
On 24 February 1613, he was consecrated bishop by Giovanni Garzia Mellini, Cardinal-Priest of Santi Quattro Coronati with Decio Caracciolo Rosso, Archbishop of Bari-Canosa, and Antonio d'Aquino, Bishop of Sarno, serving as co-consecrators. 
He served as Bishop of Lavello until his death in 1615.

References

External links and additional sources
 (Chronology of Bishops) 
 (Chronology of Bishops) 

17th-century Italian Roman Catholic bishops
Bishops appointed by Pope Paul V
1615 deaths